Tabor is a small village in the Municipality of Sežana in the Littoral region of Slovenia.

The local church is dedicated to Saint Catherine of Alexandria and belongs to the Parish of Štjak.

References

External links
Tabor on Geopedia

Populated places in the Municipality of Sežana